The Georgia Force was an Arena Football League (AFL) team based in Gwinnett County, Georgia, United States (part of suburban Atlanta) that played in the South Division of the American Conference. The team was owned by Doug MacGregor and Donn Jennings.

Following the termination of operations of the Arena Football League on August 4, 2009, Georgia Force officials quickly followed with a release that indicated that they, too, were ceasing operations.

In 2010, the Alabama Vipers announced they would leave Huntsville, and would move to suburban Atlanta for the 2011 AFL season, once again playing home games at Arena at Gwinnett Center.

Following the 2012 season, the franchise folded citing, "The market never responded to our extensive marketing and sales campaign," said team president Corey Remillard. "With all of the outreach, marketing, community and public relations that we put forward, it would have been impossible to not know that we were playing here, and the city simply did not respond. Atlanta is simply not a football town."

History

The original Nashville Kats

The team began as the first Nashville Kats team from 1997 to 2001. The original Kats played in the Nashville Arena (later known as Gaylord Entertainment Center, now known as Bridgestone Arena) in downtown Nashville and were initially coached by Eddie Khayat in 1997 and 1998. Khayat was then succeeded by Pat Sperduto for the balance of the team's time in Nashville. The Kats were the league's "Organization of the Year" for their inaugural year of 1997, and were in the playoffs for every season of their relatively brief existence, even playing in the ArenaBowl each of their final two seasons, albeit losing both times they reached the AFL's championship game.

Virgil Williams, an Atlanta businessman, purchased the franchise for nearly $10 million in December 2001, and moved the team to Atlanta after the team's previous owners failed to negotiate a favorable lease with the arena's primary tenant and manager, the National Hockey League's Nashville Predators. The Kats would return to Nashville as an expansion team in 2005 (in a situation similar to the National Football League's Cleveland Browns). The second Nashville Kats team would fold after a losing 2007 season.

First Dispersal Draft
 1. OL/DL Mike Lawson- (Miami)-formerly Florida Bobcats
 2. WR/DB Kusanti Abdul-Salaam - (UCLA)-formerly Oklahoma Wranglers
 3. FB/DB Scott Byrd Johnson (Ole Miss)-formerly-Knoxville Nighthawks(PIFL)
 4. OL/DL Marcus Keyes (North Alabama)-formerly- Florida Bobcats
 5. DS Scotty Lundsey (Stephen F. Austin)-formerly-Houston Thunderbears
6. DB Nate Jacks (University of Kansas)-formerly-Lincoln Capitols (NIFL)

Georgia Force
The rechristened Force initially played in Duluth, a suburb of Atlanta, in the Arena at Gwinnett Center until relocating in the 2004 season to Philips Arena in downtown Atlanta.

The team name was chosen through a contest in the Atlanta Journal-Constitution. Anthony R Ward submitted the winning name.

Under Williams' three-year tenure as owner, the team made the playoffs one time in 2003. Upon selling the team to Atlanta Falcons owner Arthur Blank in September 2004, it was announced that the franchise would return to the downtown Philips Arena for the 2005 season in response to fan desires as expressed in a poll. However, following the 2007 season, the Force announced they were returning to the Gwinnett Center in 2008 after signing a 10-year lease.

The Georgia Force's only rival in the Arena Football League is the New Orleans VooDoo. Previous owners of both teams, owned NFL teams in the same market. The New Orleans Saints rivaled with The Atlanta Falcons & The New Orleans VooDoo rivaled with The Georgia Force.

The 2005 season was, by far, the most successful in team history with highlights including a conference-best 11–5 record, and undefeated home record (8–0), a division title, a National Conference Championship, and a trip to ArenaBowl XIX. They lost to the Colorado Crush, 51–48.
They also won Southern Division titles in 2007 and 2008.

The Force's official mascot used to be a high-tech runner named G-Force, but was later changed to a blue, cuddly monster named Blu.

Season-by-season

Coaches
 Coaches listed are Georgia Force coaches only, not for the Nashville Kats.

Notable players

Final roster

Individual awards

All-Arena players
The following Force players were named to All-Arena Teams:
 QB Matt Nagy (1), Chris Greisen (1)
 WR/LB Derek Lee (1)
 WR Chris Jackson (1), Troy Bergeron (1), Maurice Purify (1)
 OL/DL Jermaine Smith (3), Gillis Wilson (1)
 OL Marcus Keyes (1) Shane Grice (1)
 DL Jermaine Smith (1)
 LB Umar Muhammad (1)
 DB Tracy Belton (1)
 DS Kevin Gaines (2)
 K Carlos Martinez (1)

All-Ironman players
The following Force players were named to All-Ironman Teams: 
 FB/LB Travis Reece (1), Scott Byrd Johnson (1), Matt Huebner (1)
 WR/LB Darryl Hammond (1), Derek Lee (1)
 WR/KR C. J. Johnson (1),

All-Rookie players
The following Force players were named to All-Rookie Teams:
 QB Leon Murray
 FB/LB Robert Thomas
 WR/LB Derek Lee
 OL/DL Jermaine Smith
 OS Troy Bergeron
 WR/CB Tiger Jones

Notes

External links

 Georgia Force on ArenaFan

 
2002 establishments in Georgia (U.S. state)
2008 disestablishments in Georgia (U.S. state)
2011 establishments in Georgia (U.S. state)
2012 disestablishments in Georgia (U.S. state)